Erik Silye (born 12 June 1996) is a Hungarian football player who  plays for Vasas.

Club statistics

Updated to games played as of 27 June 2020.

References

External links

1996 births
Living people
People from Orosháza
Hungarian footballers
Association football defenders
Ferencvárosi TC footballers
Soroksári TE footballers
Mezőkövesdi SE footballers
Vasas SC players
Nemzeti Bajnokság I players
Nemzeti Bajnokság II players
Sportspeople from Békés County